Secret of Treasure Mountain is a 1956 American Western film directed by Seymour Friedman and written by David Lang. The film stars Valerie French, Raymond Burr, William Prince, Lance Fuller, Susan Cummings and Pat Hogan. The film was released on June 25, 1956, by Columbia Pictures.

Plot

Cast           
Valerie French as Audrey Lancaster
Raymond Burr as Cash Larsen
William Prince as Robert Kendall
Lance Fuller as Juan Alvarado
Susan Cummings as Tawana
Pat Hogan as Vahoe
Reginald Sheffield as Edward Lancaster
Rodolfo Hoyos Jr. as Francisco Martinez

References

External links
 

1956 films
American Western (genre) films
1956 Western (genre) films
Columbia Pictures films
Films directed by Seymour Friedman
1950s English-language films
1950s American films
American black-and-white films